Elachista gerdmaritella is a moth of the family Elachistidae that is endemic to Spain.

References

gerdmaritella
Moths described in 1992
Moths of Europe